Tressider Peak is in Wrangell-St. Elias National Park and Preserve in the U.S. state of Alaska.

References

Wrangell–St. Elias National Park and Preserve
Mountains of Alaska